Isfahan Metro is a rapid transit system serving the city of Isfahan, Iran.

Lines

Line 1

There are 20 stations: Ashegh Abad (Qods), Baharestan, Golestan, Shahid Mofateh, Shahid Alikhani, Jaber, Kaveh, Shahid Chamran, Shahid Bahonar, Meydan Shohada, Takhti, Meydan-e- Emam Hossein (darvazeh Dolat), Meydan-e- Enghelab,  Si-o-se-pol, Doctor Shariati, Meydan-e-Azadi, Daneshgah(University), Kargar, Kuy-e-Emam (khabgah) and Defa-e- Moghadas(Payeneh Soffeh). Not all stations are in service at the moment.

The line was opened for commercial services on October 15, 2015. Construction commenced in 2001 but was subject to multiple delays.

The next phase would extend the line south from Shohada to the Soffeh long-distance bus terminal; in the longer term extensions are planned at both ends.

Line 2
Line 2 (blue) is planned to be an east-west line.

Line 3

Line 3 (Gold) is planned to run in the south of the city in its first stage.

Suburban rail
Three suburban rail lines are planned to feed the metro.

Network map

See also
Transportation in Isfahan

References

External links

 Subways in Iran 
 Isfahan Metro Official Website
 Isfahan Metro (urbanrail.net)

 
Standard gauge railways in Iran
Transport in Isfahan
Transportation in Isfahan Province